Mitosynum is a genus of spiny-legged rove beetles in the family Staphylinidae. There is one described species in Mitosynum, M. vockerothi.

References

Further reading

 
 
 

Oxytelinae
Articles created by Qbugbot